Asli is an Asian surname. Notable people with the surname include:

Arash Asli, Canadian businessman 
Aziz Asli (1938–2015), Iranian football goalkeeper, manager, and actor
Haseri Asli (born 1974), sprinter from Brunei

See also
Aslı, Turkish feminine given name

Surnames of Asian origin